Eagle Lake is a 56-acre lake in central Oakland County, Michigan.  The lake has a maximum depth of 20 feet.  It is located in Waterford Township.

The lake is west of Dixie Highway, north of Walton Boulevard, and east of Sashabaw Road.

Eagle Lake connects with Woodhull Lake to the east.

Namesake
Eagle Lake was named for Solomon G. Eagle (1817-1890), who, along with his wife Ellen Eagle (1815-1877) and their five children, owned a 249-acre farm in sections 3 and 4 in Waterford Township on the northern shore of the lake that would bear their family name.  Solomon was born in Ireland.

Fish
Eagle Lake fish included bluegill, pumpkinseed sunfish, northern pike, rock bass, black crappie, largemouth bass, brown bullhead, bowfin and carp.

References

Lakes of Oakland County, Michigan
Lakes of Michigan
Lakes of Waterford Township, Michigan